Sir Paul Lancelot Hawkins  (7 August 1912 – 29 December 2002) was a British Conservative Party politician.

Hawkins was born at Downham Market and was educated at Cheltenham College. He was a livestock auctioneer and chartered surveyor, and served as a councillor on Norfolk County Council. He joined the Territorial Army (TA) and served during World War II with the 7th Battalion of the Royal Norfolk Regiment, a TA unit, although his active service was brief as he was captured at Saint-Valery-en-Caux during the final stages of the Battle of France in 1940 and spent the next five years as a prisoner of war.

Hawkins was Member of Parliament (MP) for South West Norfolk from 1964 to 1987 when he retired.  Future minister Gillian Shephard was his successor.  Sir Paul was a Government Whip under Edward Heath (1970–1974), serving as an assistant whip 1970–1971, a Lord of the Treasury 1971–1973, and Vice-Chamberlain of the Household 1973–1974. He was knighted in 1982.

References
The Times Guide to the House of Commons, Times Newspapers Ltd, 1966, 1983 &1987

1912 births
2002 deaths
Royal Norfolk Regiment officers
Conservative Party (UK) MPs for English constituencies
UK MPs 1964–1966
UK MPs 1966–1970
UK MPs 1970–1974
UK MPs 1974
UK MPs 1974–1979
UK MPs 1979–1983
UK MPs 1983–1987
Knights Bachelor
Members of Norfolk County Council
Councillors in Norfolk
Politicians awarded knighthoods
British Army personnel of World War II
People from Downham Market
British World War II prisoners of war
World War II prisoners of war held by Germany
People educated at Cheltenham College